Damion DaShon Square (born February 6, 1989) is an American football defensive tackle who is a free agent. He played college football at Alabama and signed as an undrafted free agent by the Philadelphia Eagles in 2013.

High school career
He was ranked as the ninth overall linebacker prospect in the nation by Scout.com. He also was ranked as the 55th best prospect in the state of Texas by Rivals.com. He was selected to the Preseason All-Greater Team before his senior season at high school. He was selected to the All-Greater Houston team while at high school. He also was named to the third team of Dave Campbell's Texas Football Magazine's Super Team.

College career
He played college football at Alabama. In his sophomore season, he finished the season with 27 tackles and 3 sacks. He finished his last two seasons with a total of 65 tackles, 4.5 sacks, and 2 pass deflections. On July 19, 2012, he was selected to the preseason all-SEC second team prior to his senior season. Square was a three-time national champion with the Crimson Tide during his college career.

Professional career

Philadelphia Eagles
After going undrafted in the 2013 NFL Draft, Square was signed as a free agent by the Philadelphia Eagles. He was released by the Eagles on August 30, 2014.

Kansas City Chiefs
Square was claimed off waivers by the Kansas City Chiefs on September 1, 2014. He was released by the Chiefs on October 31.

San Diego / Los Angeles Chargers
After he was released by the Chiefs, Square was claimed off waivers by the San Diego Chargers on November 3, 2014.
On March 11, 2016, he was re-signed by the Chargers to a one-year contract. On September 3, 2016, he was suspended by the NFL for the first four games of the 2016 NFL season.

On March 10, 2017, Square signed a two-year contract extension with the Chargers. He then signed one-year contracts in 2019 and 2020. He was placed on the active/non-football injury list to start training camp on August 2, 2020, and was activated five days later.

Cleveland Browns
On May 4, 2021, Square signed with the Cleveland Browns. The Cleveland Browns terminated Square’s contract on August 19, 2021.

New Orleans Saints
On August 27, 2021, Square signed with the New Orleans Saints, but was released four days later.

Chicago Bears
On September 8, 2021, Square was signed to the Chicago Bears practice squad.

Las Vegas Raiders
On September 15, 2021, Square was signed by the Las Vegas Raiders off the Bears practice squad. He was waived by the Raiders on December 11, 2021 and re-signed to the practice squad.

Cincinnati Bengals
On January 25, 2022, Square was signed to the Cincinnati Bengals practice squad. On January 30, 2022, Square became the first player in NFL history to play for two teams in one postseason.

Personal life
Square's wife is named Brandi. They have a son, and a daughter born in November 2015.

References

External linker

Alabama Crimson Tide bio
Pro Football reference

1989 births
Living people
Alabama Crimson Tide football players
American football defensive ends
American football defensive tackles
Chicago Bears players
Cincinnati Bengals players
Cleveland Browns players
Kansas City Chiefs players
Las Vegas Raiders players
Los Angeles Chargers players
New Orleans Saints players
Philadelphia Eagles players
Players of American football from Houston
San Diego Chargers players